Fair Wisconsin, previously called Equality Wisconsin is a nonprofit social welfare organization dedicated to securing equal rights under the law for Wisconsin's gay, lesbian, bisexual and transgender (LGBT) community. The organization was founded in 2001 as LGBT Center Advocates, consolidating elements of the Domestic Partnership Task Force, the Human Rights League, and the LGBT Alliance for Equality. The organization claims several accomplishments in areas of domestic partner recognition, non-discrimination, and securing greater resources for LGBT social services.

History
During the first years of its existence, the organization was affiliated with the Milwaukee LGBT Community Center. It grew dramatically from 2004 to 2005 in preparation to oppose a constitutional ban on civil unions and marriages for same-sex partners, with efforts to organize clergy against the ban and persuade voters in door-to-door canvassing. Center Advocates worked with Madison-based Action Wisconsin to organize against the ban from 2004 to 2005, formalizing one unified campaign known as Fair Wisconsin in early 2006. However, the constitutional ban passed in November 2006.

In 2007, Center Advocates advocated for domestic partner benefits for Milwaukee Public Schools employees, and additional nondiscrimination protections for transgender people in the City of Milwaukee.

Center Advocates became an independent advocacy organization in 2008, and in June 2009 its members voted to change the agency's name to Equality Wisconsin. A charitable arm, Equality Wisconsin Fund, was established in 2008.

In 2009, Equality Wisconsin supported Governor Jim Doyle's domestic partner proposals in the state budget, and sought to educate the public about the new provisions available to gay and lesbian couples. Educational efforts in religious communities and Milwaukee's Latino community were also ongoing in 2009.

In 2013 Equality Wisconsin merged with its Madison counterpart, Fair Wisconsin. The organization is now called Fair Wisconsin and is based in Madison.

See also

Recognition of same-sex unions in Wisconsin

References

External links
Fair Wisconsin website

Non-profit organizations based in Wisconsin
LGBT political advocacy groups in Wisconsin
Organizations established in 2001
2001 establishments in Wisconsin